Galeaspida (from Latin, 'Helmet shields') is an extinct taxon of jawless marine and freshwater fish. The name is derived from galea, the Latin word for helmet, and refers to their massive bone shield on the head. Galeaspida lived in shallow, fresh water and marine environments during the Silurian and Devonian times (430 to 370 million years ago) in what is now Southern China, Tibet and Vietnam. Superficially, their morphology appears more similar to that of Heterostraci than Osteostraci, there being currently no evidence that the galeaspids had paired fins. A galeaspid Tujiaaspis vividus from the Silurian period of China was described in 2022 as having a precursor condition to the form of paired fins seen in Osteostraci and gnathostomes. Earlier than this, Galeaspida were already in fact regarded as being more closely related to Osteostraci, based on the closer similarity of the morphology of the braincase.

Morphology

The defining characteristic of all galeaspids was a large opening on the dorsal surface of the head shield, which was connected to the pharynx and gill chamber, and a scalloped pattern of the sensory-lines.

The opening appears to have served both the olfaction and the intake of the respiratory water similar to the nasopharyngeal duct of hagfishes. Galeaspids are also the vertebrates which have the largest number of gills, as some species of the order Polybranchiaspidida (literally "many gills shields") had up to 45 gill openings. The body is covered with minute scales arranged in oblique rows and there is no other fin besides the caudal fin. The mouth and gill openings are situated on the ventral side of the head, which is flat or flattened and suggests that they were bottom-dwellers.

Taxonomy
There are around 76 + described species of galeaspids in at least 53 genera.

If the families Hanyangaspidae and Xiushuiaspidae can be ignored as basal galeaspids, the rest of Galeaspida can be sorted into two main groups: the first being the order Eugaleaspidiformes, which comprises the genera Sinogaleaspis, Meishanaspis, and Anjianspis, and the family Eugaleaspididae, and the second being the Supraorder Polybranchiaspidida, which comprises the order Polybranchiaspidiformes, which is the sister taxon of the family Zhaotongaspididae and the order Huananaspidiformes, and the family Geraspididae, which is the sister taxon of Polybranchiaspidiformes + Zhaotongaspididae + Huananaspidiformes.

Some experts demote Galeaspida to the rank of subclass, and unite it with Pituriaspida and Osteostraci to form the class Monorhina.

Fossil Record
The oldest known galeaspids, such as those of the genera Hanyangaspis and Dayongaspis, first appear near the start of the Telychian age, of the latter half of the Llandovery epoch of the Silurian, about 436 million years ago.  During the transition from the Llandovery to the Wenlock, the Eugaleaspids underwent a diversification event.  By the time the Wenlock epoch transitioned into the Ludlow Epoch, all of the eugaleaspids, save for the Eugaleaspidae, were extinct.  The Eugaleaspidae lived from the Wenlock, and were fairly long-lived, especially the genus Eugaleaspis.  The last of the Eugaleaspididae disappeared by the end of the Pragian Epoch of the Lower Devonian.

The first genus of Geraspididae, the eponymous Geraspis, appears during the middle of the Telychian.  The other genera of Polybranchiaspidida appear in the fossil record a little after the beginning of the Lochkovian Epoch, at the start of the Devonian.  The vast majority of the supraorder's genera either date from the Pragian epoch, or have their ranges end there.  By the time the Emsian epoch starts, only a few genera, such as Duyunolepis and Wumengshanaspis, survive, with most others already extinct.  The last galeaspid is an as yet undescribed species and genus from the Fammenian epoch of the Late Devonian, found in association with the tetrapod Sinostega and the antiarch placoderm Remigolepis, in strata from the Northern Chinese province of Ningxia.

Taxa
 
 Family Hanyangaspididae Pan & Liu 1975
Hanyangaspis Pan & Liu 1975
 Nanjiangaspis Wang et al. 2002
 Kalpinolepis Wang, Wang & Zhu 1996
 Konoceras Pan 1992
Latirostraspis Wang, Xia & Chen 1980
 Family Xiushuiaspididae Pan & Liu 1975
Changxingaspis Wan 1991
 Microphymaspis Wang et al. 2002
 Xiushuiaspis Pan & Wang 1983
 Family Dayongaspididae Pan & Zen 1985
Dayongaspis Pan & Zen 1985
 Platycarpaspis Wang et al. 2002
 Order Eugaleaspidiformes Liu 1965
 Yongdongaspis Chen et al., 2022
 Family Shuyuidae Shan et al. 2020
 Meishanaspis Wang 1991
 Shuyu Gai et al. 2011
 Family Tridenaspididae Liu 1986
 Pterogonaspis Zhu 1992
 Tridenaspis Liu 1986
 Family Sinogaleaspididae Pan & Wang 1980
 Anjiaspis Gai & Zhu 2005
 Sinogaleaspis Pan & Wang 1980
 Rumporostralis Shan et al. 2020
 Family Eugaleaspididae Liu 1980
 ?Liuaspis Whitley 1976 non Borchsenius 1960
 Dunyu Zhu et al. 2012
 Eugaleaspis Liu 1965 [Galeaspis Liu 1965 non Ivshin ex Borukaev 1955]
 Nochelaspis Zhu 1992
 Pseudoduyunaspis Wang, Wang & Zhu 1996
 Yunnanogaleaspis Pan & Wang 1980
 Super order Polybranchiaspidida Liu 1965
 Order Polybranchiaspidiformes Janvier 1996
Family Gumuaspididae Gai et al. 2018
Gumuaspis Wang & Wang 1992
Platylomaspis Gai et al. 2018
Nanningaspis Gai et al. 2018
Laxaspis Liu 1975 
 Family Geraspididae Pan & Chen 1993
Geraspis Pan & Chen 1993
Kwangnanaspis Cao 1979 
 Family Pentathyraspididae Pan 1992
Pentathyraspis Pan 1992
Microhoplonaspis Pan 1992
 Family Duyunolepididae Pan & Wang 1978a
Duyunolepis Pan & Wang 1982
 Pseudoduyunolepis
 Paraduyunolepis Pan & Wang 1978
 Neoduyunolepis Pan & Wang 1978
 Lopadaspis Wang et al. 2002
Family Hyperaspididae Pan 1992
Hyperaspis Pan 1992
Family Polybranchiaspididae Liu 1965
Altigibbaspis Liu, Gai & Zhu 2017
Polybranchiaspis Liu 1965
Bannhuanaspis Janvier, Than & Phuon 1993
Clororbis Pan & Ji 1993 
Dongfangaspis Liu 1975
Siyingia Wang & Wang 1982
Diandongaspis Liu 1975
Damaspis Wang & Wang 1982
Cyclodiscaspis Liu 1975
Order Huananaspidiformes Janvier 1975
 Family Sanqiaspididae Liu 1975
Sanqiaspis Liu 1975 
 Family Zhaotongaspididae Wang & Zhu 1994
Zhaotongaspis Wang & Zhu 1994
Wenshanaspis Zhao, Zhu & Jia 2002
 Family Sanchaspididae Pan & Wang 1981 
Sanchaspis Pan & Wanao 1981 (not to be confused with Sanqiaspis)
Antiquisagittaspis Liu 1985
 Family Gantarostrataspididae Wang & Wang 1992
Gantarostrataspis Wang & Wang 1992
Wumengshanaspis Wang & Lan 1984
Rhegmaspis Gai et al. 2015
 Family Huananaspidae Liu 1973 
Huanaspis Liu 1973 (sister-taxon of Macrothyraspinae)
Asiaspis Pan ex Pan, Wang & Liu 1975
Nanpanaspis Liu 1965
Stephaspis Gai & Zhu 2007
 Subfamily Macrothyraspinae
Macrothyraspis Pan 1992
Lungmenshanaspis Pan & Wang 1975
Qingmenaspis Pan & Wang 1981 
Sinoszechuanaspis Pan & Wang 1975

See also
Osteostraci
Heterostraci

References

 Pan Jiang, "New Galeaspids (Agnatha) From the Silurian and Devonian of China In English" 1992, 
 Janvier, Philippe.  Early Vertebrates  Oxford, New York: Oxford University Press, 1998.  
 Long, John A. The Rise of Fishes: 500 Million Years of Evolution Baltimore: The Johns Hopkins University Press, 1996.  
Zhu Min, Gai Zhikun.  "Phylogenetic relationships of Galeaspids (Agnatha)" 2007 :Higher Education Press and Springer-Verlag 2007

External links 
 Galeaspida - tolweb.org

 
Wenlock first appearances
Early Devonian extinctions
Prehistoric fish classes